Matt Lang is a Canadian country singer and songwriter. He is signed to the Jayward Artist Group, and has released one album More and four singles.

Early life
Lang is from Maniwaki, Quebec. He recalls Johnny Cash's "Folsom Prison Blues" as the first song he ever performed live. While primarily playing hockey as a teenager, Lang realized his true passion was writing and performing music. He cites Cash, Dwight Yoakam, and Merle Haggard as artists he listened to growing up, in addition to regional Quebecois acts Kaïn, Les Colocs, and Okoumé.

Career
Lang began his career as a Francophone singer on Quebec reality show La Voix, North America's French language counterpart to The Voice. He subsequently released a French album before deciding to pursue his passion for country music. When he travelled to Nashville, Tennessee in 2018, Lang stated he was then only learning to speak the English language, while working on his self-titled extended play.

Lang won the second annual SiriusXM "Top of the Country" competition in September 2019. He released his debut country music album, More, in June 2020, which contains the singles "Water Down the Whiskey", "Getcha", "Only a Woman", and "In a Bar". Lang noted influence of Bakersfield sound and the western-influenced Franco-country music of Quebec in his music.

Discography

Albums

Extended plays

Singles

Music videos

Awards and nominations

References

External links

Living people
Canadian country singer-songwriters
Canadian male singer-songwriters
Musicians from Quebec
Singers from Quebec
French Quebecers
People from Maniwaki
Participants in Canadian reality television series
21st-century Canadian male singers
Year of birth missing (living people)